Keisuke Ogawa (born 5 September 1986) is a Japanese footballer, who plays for Taichung Futuro.

Career
Born in Itami, Japan, Ogawa played for Kobe FC in the Japanese regional league after graduating from Hannan University prior to joining Albirex Niigata Singapore FC where he played between 2007 and 2010.  In 2010 he joined Pattaya United in the Thai Premier League where he played until the end of 2012.

During the winter break of the 2012–13 season he moved to Europe and joined FC Jūrmala. He quickly became a regular and made 9 appearances with Jurmala in the 2013 Latvian Higher League before leaving the club in summer.  He came along with Shohei Okuno to Serbia and after a successful trial period they both signed with FK Sloboda Užice. But he failed to make an appearance during the six months at the club and left during the winter transfer window.

References

External links
 
 

Albirex Niigata players
Japanese footballers
Japanese expatriate footballers
Living people
Japanese expatriate sportspeople in Malaysia
Expatriate footballers in Thailand
Expatriate footballers in Malaysia
Expatriate footballers in Singapore
1986 births
People from Itami, Hyōgo
Taiwan Football Premier League players
Taichung Futuro F.C. players
Keisuke Ogawa
FC Jūrmala players
Expatriate footballers in Latvia
Japanese expatriate sportspeople in Latvia
FK Sloboda Užice players
Expatriate footballers in Serbia
Japanese expatriate sportspeople in Cambodia
Sabah F.C. (Malaysia) players
Association football defenders
Japanese expatriate sportspeople in Taiwan
Association football midfielders